Anders Manga is an American recording artist best known for his self named Darkwave work and under the name Bloody Hammers. His first release was under the name "Coffin Moth" in 1997, a Deathrock music project. In 2012, Anders' song "Glamour" was featured in Season 4 Episode 04 of The Vampire Diaries

In 2019, he released "The Summoning, a new album by Bloody Hammers, his heavy rock project with wife Devallia. In late 2013 he signed Bloody Hammers to Napalm Records and have since released four albums with the label. In 2015 he started another project inspired by horror soundtracks from the seventies and eighties called Terrortron which was featured on the Rue Morgue (magazine) compilation titled "They Came From Rue Morgue".

Personal life
He is currently married to band member Devallia since 2005.

Musical Influences
Anders was eleven years old when he first began teaching himself Bass guitar, after borrowing a bass from a neighborhood friend.
Anders identifies Alice Cooper as having been his main musical influence as a child, and has said that he was the reason why he wanted to pursue music. Other artists such as Gary Numan, Nick Cave, Roky Erickson, The Sisters of Mercy and Black Sabbath also had a major influence on his musical tastes.

Current Band Members
Devallia (Organ) & Anders Manga (Vocals, Bass, Guitar)

Discography

Albums

Coffin Moth
Coffin Moth (1997) (Self Released)

Solo releases
Murder in the Convent (1999) (Vampture)
One Up for the Dying (2004) (Vampture)
Left of an All-Time Low (2005) (Vampture)
Welcome to the Horror Show (2006) (Vampture)
Blood Lush (2007) (Vampture)
X's & the Eyes (2008) (Vampture)
Perfectly Stranger (2018) (Sacrificial Records)
Andromeda (2020)

Bloody Hammers
Bloody Hammers (2012) (SoulSeller Records)
Spiritual Relics (2013) (SoulSeller Records)
Under Satan's Sun (2014) (Napalm Records)
Lovely Sort of Death (2016) (Napalm Records)
The Horrific Case of Bloody Hammers (2016) (Napalm Records)
The Summoning (2019) (Napalm Records)
Songs of Unspeakable Terror (2021) (Napalm Records)

TerrortronHexed (2015) (Sacrificial Records)Necrophiliac Among the Living Dead (2016) (Sacrificial Records)Orgy of the Vampires (2017) (Sacrificial Records)

Other releasesThe Traumatics - The Traumatics (1993) (Irregular Records)The Traumatics - Republic (1995) (Irregular Records)The Dogwoods - The Dogwoods  (1997) (Irregular Records)A Tribute to Alice Cooper (1998) (Wasted Records)Interbreeding VIII: Elements of Violence (2006) (BLC Productions)Sweet Leaf - A Tribute to Black Sabbath'' (2015) (Cleopatra Records)

References
Interview with Anders Manga on VampireFreaks.com (2007)
Interview with Anders Manga at Side-Line.com
Article on Side-Line.com "Anders Manga finishes 3rd album"
regenmag.com Artist Spotlight: Anders Manga
"Blood Lush" Review on Chain D.L.K. by Steve Mecca
Review of "Left of an All-Time Low at virus-mag.com by Vlad McNeally (2006)
Anders Manga at Metropolis Records
Interview at Guitar World
Interview at Meta Temple
Interview at Zombie Hamster
August 2014 Interview with Metal-Temple.com
May 2014 Interview with KAMP Arizona State Student Radio
Interview with Harvest Moon Music 2013
AXS.com Interview with Anders Manga
'Lovely Sort of Death' article on noisey.vice.com

External links
 Official website

Living people
American male singers
American rock singers
Dark wave musicians
Gothic rock musicians
Death rock musicians
Year of birth missing (living people)